The women's team pursuit race of the 2015–16 ISU Speed Skating World Cup 4, arranged in the Thialf arena in Heerenveen, Netherlands, was held on 12 December 2015.

The Japanese team won the race, while the Dutch team came second, and the Polish team came third.

Results
The race took place on Saturday, 12 December, in the afternoon session, scheduled at 16:40.

References

Women team pursuit
4